Zacco taliensis is a species of cyprinid of the genus Zacco. It inhabits Erhai Lake in Yunnan, China. It was described by Charles Tate Regan in 1907, is considered harmless to humans and has not been classified on the IUCN Red List.

References

Cyprinid fish of Asia
Freshwater fish of China
Fish described in 1907